In enzymology, a lysyltransferase is an enzyme that catalyzes the chemical reaction

L-lysyl-tRNA + phosphatidylglycerol  tRNA + 3-phosphatidyl-1'-(3'-O-L-lysyl)glycerol

Thus, the two substrates of this enzyme are L-lysyl-tRNA and phosphatidylglycerol, whereas its two products are tRNA and 3-phosphatidyl-1'-(3'-O-L-lysyl)glycerol.

This enzyme belongs to the family of transferases, specifically the aminoacyltransferases.  The systematic name of this enzyme class is L-lysyl-tRNA:phosphatidylglycerol 3-O-lysyltransferase.

References

 

	

EC 2.3.2
Enzymes of unknown structure